Gilbert Klapper is a paleontologist.

In 1971, with Graeme M. Philip, he described the conodont family Cryptotaxidae and the conodont genus Cryptotaxis.

In 1981, he described the conodont families Distomodontidae and Kockelellidae.

Awards 
He received the Pander Medal, an award from the Pander Society, an informal organisation founded in 1967 for the promotion of the study of conodont palaeontology.

References

External links 
 Gilbert Klapper at Northwestern University website (retrieved 14 July 2016)

Paleontologists
Conodont specialists